Ettore Bulgarelli (born 20 April 1965) is an Italian rower. He competed in the men's eight event at the 1988 Summer Olympics.

References

External links
 

1965 births
Living people
Italian male rowers
Olympic rowers of Italy
Rowers at the 1988 Summer Olympics
Place of birth missing (living people)